Bryan Burk (born December 30, 1968) is an American film and television producer.

He is mostly known for producing movies in collaboration with J. J. Abrams, including the Star Trek reboot series, the Mission: Impossible films Ghost Protocol and Rogue Nation, Star Wars: The Force Awakens, and the TV series Alias, Lost, Fringe, and Person of Interest. His only work outside of producing was co-writing the Fringe episode "There's More Than One of Everything".

Career
Born to a Jewish family, Burk is a graduate of USC's School of Cinema-Television in 1991. He began his career working with producers Brad Weston at Columbia Pictures, Ned Tanen at Sony Pictures and John Davis at FOX. In 1995, he joined Gerber Pictures, where he developed TNT's Emmy-winning James Dean.

Together with J. J. Abrams, he founded the production company Bad Robot Productions in 2001. As Executive Vice President of the company, Burk serves as executive producer for all of their television and film productions.

In 2009, Burk co-wrote the story of the season one finale of Fringe, "There's More Than One of Everything", with Akiva Goldsman, while Jeff Pinkner and J. H. Wyman wrote the teleplay.

He frequently collaborates with a tightly knit group of film professionals which include J. J. Abrams, Damon Lindelof, Adam Horowitz, Alex Kurtzman, Roberto Orci, Edward Kitsis, Andre Nemec, Josh Appelbaum, and Jeff Pinkner.

Filmography

Feature films

Television
Executive producer

Co-producer
 Alias (2001–2006)

References

External links

1968 births
American film producers
Jewish American screenwriters
American television producers
American television writers
American male television writers
Living people
USC School of Cinematic Arts alumni
Place of birth missing (living people)
21st-century American Jews